Brighton, or Brighton Cross, is a hamlet in Cornwall, England, UK.

References

External links

Hamlets in Cornwall